Wicked Weasel Pty. Ltd. is an Australian manufacturer of swimwear and lingerie for women. It is especially known for its microkinis. The company was founded in 1994 by Peter Gifford, formerly the bass player for Midnight Oil, and named after his girlfriend's nickname. Initially, the company's products were trial-marketed to Melbourne area strippers.

The first Wicked Weasel retail store was opened in Cairns in 1995, but it moved to Byron Bay the following year, where the company headquarters had remained until moving to Mullumbimby in 2020. Additional stores at Bondi and in Melbourne have been opened a number of times with inconsistent success. Wicked Weasel launched www.wickedweasel.com in mid-1999, making it the first Australian swimwear maker to sell online. By 2003, it was the largest Australian retailer of clothing via the internet. As of 2007, the website received over 100,000 unique visitors per day. Wicked Weasel had 45–50 employees as of 2011.

As part of a contest, Wicked Weasel also publishes online pictures of women who wear their products.

Wicked Weasel products are no longer produced in Australia. The company ceased Australian manufacturing after the relocation to Mullumbimby in 2020 and switched to shipping from the US sometime in 2022

See also

 Bikini
 Lingerie
 List of swimwear brands
 Swimwear 
 Underwear

References

External links

 Official Website
 
 
 Official Wicked Weasel Online Community

1994 establishments in Australia
Byron Bay, New South Wales
Clothing brands of Australia
Companies based in New South Wales
Midnight Oil
Clothing companies established in 1994
Retail companies established in 1995
Sportswear brands
Surfwear brands
Swimwear manufacturers
Underwear brands